Gloria Victis may refer to:

 Gloria Victis (sculpture), by Antonin Mercié
 Gloria Victis (novella), by Eliza Orzeszkowa
 Gloria Victis Memorial, Budapest, Hungary memorial
 Gloria Victis (Confederate monument), or Fame, a Confederate monument in Salisbury, North Carolina